Statistics of Qatar Stars League for the 2007–08 season.

Overview
It was contested by 10 teams, and Al-Gharafa Sports Club won the championship.

League standings

Top goalscorers
Source: goalzz.com

27 goals
 Clemerson (Al-Gharafa)

18 goals
 Leonardo Pisculichi (Al-Arabi)

17 goals
 Sebastián Soria (Qatar SC)

16 goals
 Younis Mahmoud (Al-Gharafa)

15 goals
 Adil Ramzi (Al-Wakrah)
 Abdoulaye Cissé (Al-Sailiya)

13 goals
 Carlos Tenorio (Al-Sadd)
 Ali Boussaboun (Al-Wakrah)

References
Qatar - List of final tables (RSSSF)

2007–08 in Asian association football leagues
2007–08 in Qatari football